Cyrtoclymeniaceae was an extinct superfamily of ammonites that existed during the Devonian.

References

Devonian ammonites
Late Devonian first appearances
Late Devonian animals
Famennian extinctions
Cyrtoclymeniina